Ilesa is an ancient town located in the Osun State, southwest Nigeria; it is also the name of a historic kingdom (also known as Ijesha) centred on that town. The state is ruled by a monarch bearing the title of the Owa Obokun Adimula of Ijesaland. The state of Ilesa consisted of Ilesa itself and a number of smaller surrounding cities.

The Ijesa, a term also denoting the people of the state of Ilesa, are part of the present Osun State of Nigeria. Some of the popular towns of the Ijesa are Odo-Ijesa, Ilaje, Igbogi, Ise-Ijesa, Ibokun, Erin Ijesa, Ijeda-Ijesa, Ipetu Jesa, Ijebu-Jesa, Esa-Oke,Esa Odo, Ipole Ijesa, Ifewara Ijesa, Ipo Arakeji, Iloko Ijesa, Iwara Ijesa, Iperindo Ijesa, Erinmo Ijesa, Iwaraja Ijesa, Oke-Ana Ijesa, Idominasi, Ilase Ijesa, Igangan ijesa, Imo Ijesa, Alakowe Ijesa, Osu Ijesa, Eti Oni, Itaore, Itagunmodi, Iyinta, Itaapa, Epe Ijesa, Omo Ijesa, Eti-oni, Ibokun, Inila, Ijinla, Iloba Ijesa, Odo Ijesa, Imogbara Ijesa, Eseun Ijesa, Iloo, Owena Ijesa, Ido Ijesa, Ido Oko, Ibala Ijesa, Ere Ijesa, Ilahun, Ibodi, Ijaaregbe, Ikinyinwa, Idominasi, Ilowa, and Ibodi.

The state of Ijeshaland was founded c.1300 by Ajibogun Ajaka Owa Obokun Onida Raharaha, a warlike youngest son of Yoruba Projenitor Oduduwa.

Oral history

According to the historian  Samuel Johnson:

 Odo - Ile {Logun Edu} was Oduduwa's Grandchild by Oduduwa's Eldest Daughter (Logun Edu's own son became the First Odole of Ijesaland - {Odole Nikunogbo} [Prime-Minister/Secretary of State of Ijesaland]

Colonial assessment
The village was described by the Rev. William Howard Clark in 1854 in the following manner:

The Ijesa Monarchs
There are four royal houses amongst which accession to the throne is supposed to be rotated: Biladu, Bilagbayo, Bilaro and Bilayirere. 
Rulers, under the title of Owa Obokun Adimula, have been as follows:

Notable people
Israel Olatunde Adedeji-Orolugbagbe, JP, BA London (Erudite Scholar & Renowned Educationist) {Tutor Christ School, Ado-Ekiti, St. Luke’s College, Ibadan, Ilesa Grammar School, Ilesa, Member, Ijesa Union, Ibadan, Ijesa Progressive Circle (now Ijesa Progressive Council), Ijesa Improvement Society (Egbe Atunluse Ile-Ijesa)}(An Odole Yoloye Descendant)
Royal High Chief Adebola Oyeleye Adedeji-Orolugbagbe (RHC Oyegbulu 1 - Odole-Owa of IjesaLand) (Prime Minister/Secretary of State, IjesaLand (An Odole Yoloye Descendant)

T. M. Aluko OBE OON
Akinloye Akinyemi, Nigerian major
Chief Lawrence Omole, Business mogul and industrialist
Tosho Obembe, Business mogul and industrialist
L.O Ayeni Rational, Business mogul and industrialist
Dr. Fajemisin, Medical Doctor
Prof Wale Omole, University Lecturer and Former VC OAU Ile Ife
Olu Abiola, Business mogul and industrialist
Prof Ibidapo-Obe, University Lecturer and Former VC University of Lagos
Samuel Olatunde Fadahunsi,  Commander of the Order of Niger, CON and President of the Council for the Regulation of Engineering in Nigeria (COREN)
Hon. Justice Kayode Eso. Justice of the Supreme Court of Nigeria (An Odole Gidigbi Faloju Descendant) 
Hon. Justice Samuel Omotunde Ilori. Chief Justice of Lagos State of Nigeria (An Arapate Descendant)
Professor Bolaji Akinyemi, a Nigerian Minister of Foreign Affairs and a professor of political science
Moses Olaiya (also known as Baba Sala), a famous comedian
Ogbeni Rauf Aregbesola, a Governor of Osun State
Isaac Folorunsho Adewole, a Nigerian Minister of Health and a former Vice Chancellor of University of Ibadan
Pastor Enoch Adeboye, general overseer of the Redeemed Christian Church of God
Pastor Timothy Oluwole Obadare, of CAC WOSEM.
Pastor William Kumuyi, General Superintendent of Deeper Christian Life Ministries
 Prince Adegoke Aromolaran, Business mogul and industrialist.
Yinka Jegede-Ekpe
Chief Ogedengbe Agbogungboro of Atorin, IjesaLand, First Obanla of Ilesa

References

External links
http://osun.gov.ng/about/major-towns/ilesa/

Populated places in Osun State
Cities in Yorubaland
Cities in Nigeria
14th-century establishments in Nigeria